Arlen Alexander Escarpeta is a Belizean-born American actor. He is best known for his roles in the films Friday the 13th, Brotherhood, Final Destination 5, Into the Storm (2014), and most notably, his portrayal of Bobby Brown in the 2015 film Whitney.

Career
In 2000, Escarpeta received his first on-screen role in Greg Morgan's The Playaz Court. In the following years, he appeared in various television programs such as Boston Public, The Shield, Judging Amy and Boomtown. In 2002, Escarpeta appeared in  High Crimes. In that same year, he was cast as Sam Walker in the historical drama series American Dreams, which aired on NBC.

Escarpeta then appeared in American Gun. He also appeared television shows ER and Cold Case. The following year, he co-starred with Matthew McConaughey and Matthew Fox in true-life drama We Are Marshall.

In 2007, Escarpeta appeared in David Wain's comedy film, The Ten. He made appearances on Law and Order: SVU and Without a Trace, respectively. In 2009, he starred in Preston Whitmore's Dough Boys. He also starred as a young LAPD officer on patrol during the racial gang war in the drama 818, on which Escarpeta also serves co-producer. He appeared as Lawrence in the 2009 version of Friday the 13th. He followed the film with an additional television appearance on the short-lived medical drama, Mental.

Escarpeta followed Friday the 13th with leading roles in several features, including  Brotherhood. Escarpeta had a role in Final Destination 5 as Nathan Sears, and he dubbed the same role in the Latin Spanish dub. It was the fifth film in the horror franchise, and was featured in 3D.

In November 2011, Escarpeta made an appearance on The CW's The Secret Circle. He also appeared in an episode of FOX's House (2012), NBC's Grimm (2014), and CBS' Extant (2014).

Escarpeta played the role of Bobby Brown in the new Whitney Houston biopic, Whitney, airing on Lifetime on January 17, 2015.

Filmography

Film and TV Movies

Television

References

External links

1981 births
African-American male actors
Living people
American television actors
American people of Belizean descent
21st-century American male actors
American male film actors
Belizean emigrants to the United States
21st-century African-American people
20th-century African-American people